Tell Tale Productions Inc. is a media production company based in Halifax, Nova Scotia, Canada, specializing in one-off documentaries, factual entertainment series, and interactive media.

Documentaries 
 Forever Young (2015) broadcast on CBC Firsthand
 A TV Renaissance (2015) broadcast on CBC Doc Zone
 Santa Quest (2014)
 Bounty: Into The Hurricane (2014) broadcast on CBC Absolutely Maritimes
 Trek of the Titans (2014) broadcast on CBC The Nature of Things
 Bite Me: The Bed Bug Invasion (2013) broadcast on CBC Doc Zone
 Counterfeit Culture (2013) broadcast on CBC Doc Zone
 BorderLine (2012) broadcast on Super Channel (Canada)
 Our Lady (2012) broadcast on VisionTV
 Facebook Follies (2011) broadcast on CBC Doc Zone
 Web Warriors (2008) broadcast on CBC Doc Zone

Television series 
 The Curse of Oak Island (2014) broadcast on History (Canada)
 Maritime Vignettes (2009–2014) broadcast on CBC Land and Sea
  "Halifax Underground" (2015)
  "Ghost Towns" (2015)
  "A Tale Of Two Moose" (2015)
 "Growing Concern" (2015)
 "Come From Away" (2015)
 "Birds At Risk" (2014)
 "Invasive Species" (2014)
 "The Sinking of the Bounty " (2014)
 "Lucky to be Alive" (2014)
 "Oh Christmas Tree" (2013)
 "Wild Food" (2013)
 "Lighthouses" (2013)
 "Nova Scotia Islands" (2013)
 "Whale Rescue" (2013)
 "Maritime Shipbuilding" (2012)
 "Pirates and Privateers" (2012)
 "Rum Running" (2012)
 "The Last Sardine Outpost" (2012)
 "Nova Scotia Schooners'" (2011)
 "Algae: The Future of Fuel" (2011) 
 "Concordia:  Tall Ship Down" (2010) 
 "Turning a Green Leaf" (2009)
 Code Green (2006) broadcast on CBC

Mobile apps 
 iMary (2012)

Web series 
 Tall Ship Odyssey (2015) on Discovery Canada

References

External links 
 

Film production companies of Canada
Television production companies of Canada
Documentary film production companies